The Hippodrome of San Siro is a horse racing venue in Milan, Italy, which takes its name from the neighborhood of the same name in which it is located.

History 
Designed in 1913 to replace the then-used Trotter in Via Padova, the Hippodrome of San Siro was inaugurated on 25 July 1920, with its construction work being slowed down due to the World War I. In 1999 a statue of Leonardo's horse was placed in the square in front of the racecourse. Together with the San Siro stadium and the PalaLido it constitutes the sports citadel of Milan. It is owned by Snaitech.

Features 
The racecourse can accommodate 15,000 spectators, of which 2,200 with seats.

Races 

Group 2 races include the Oaks d'Italia, Gran Premio di Milano, Premio Federico Tesio, Premio Vittorio di Capua, Gran Criterium, Gran Premio del Jockey Club and Premio Dormello. Group 3 races include the Premio Carlo Vittadini, Premio Primi Passi, Premio del Giubileo, Premio Elena e Sergio Cumani, Premio Verziere, Premio del Piazzale and St. Leger Italiano.

See also

Hippodrome
Leonardo's horse
PalaLido
San Siro
San Siro, Milan

References

External links

 

Horse racing venues in Italy
1920 establishments in Italy
Sports venues completed in 1920
Sports venues in Milan